The Center for Responsible Lending (CRL) is a nonprofit organization research and policy group based in Durham, North Carolina. Its stated purpose is to educate the public about financial products and to push for policies that curb predatory lending. On its website and elsewhere, CRL describes its mission as that of "protecting homeownership and family wealth by working to eliminate abusive financial practices." CRL is affiliated with the Center for Community Self-Help.

History 
Established in 2002 by Self-Help, CRL is a nonprofit, nonpartisan research and policy organization that focuses on financial products and services, including mortgages, credit cards, payday lending, and bank overdraft fees. It is affiliated with the Self-Help Credit Union, also founded by Martin Eakes in Durham, North Carolina. It has issued research reports, issue briefs and policy statements on a range of topics. CRL has pushed hard for financial reform—including the creation of the Consumer Financial Protection Agency—in the wake of the mortgage meltdown

The founders of CRL are Herbert Sandler and his wife Marion Sandler, founders of the Sandler Foundation. The Sandlers have been heavily criticized for their role in the 2008 financial crisis. Their financial company, Golden West, was one of the many banks to offer the adjustable rate mortgages that were blamed for the subprime mortgage crisis. The Sandlers' ties to the financial crisis were detailed by CBS's 60 Minutes.

Martin Eakes, the current CEO of CRL and Self-Help, describes the mission of the organization as follows: "The economic problems we've seen in subprime lending came about through a narrow focus on self-enrichment among brokers, lenders and investors on Wall Street. We must redefine success to include the common good, and recognize that we are all enriched through sustainable lending that strengthens families and communities."

Lobbying work 
An investigation by Politico revealed CRL had a heavy role in helping the Consumer Financial Protection Bureau (CFPB) draft new regulations on payday loans. According to Politico, "The group regularly sent over policy papers, traded emails and met multiple times with top officials responsible for drafting the rule. At the same time, the group's financial services business, Self Help Credit Union, was pushing CFPB to support its own small-dollar loan product with a much lower interest rate as an alternative to payday loans."

CRL opposed the Mortgage Choice Act of 2013 (H.R. 3211; 113 Congress), a bill that would direct the CFPB to amend its regulations related to qualified mortgages to reflect new exclusions made by this bill. The CRL called it a "bill that would threaten the safety of home loans and leave consumers vulnerable to excessive fees." According to the CRL, the bill "would allow the fees from affiliated title companies to be exempt from the fee limits in the definition of a Qualified Mortgage."

Influence on Operation Choke Point

An investigation by the House Oversight Committee found that the Federal Deposit and Insurance Commission  took a prominent role in Operation Choke Point, an interagency initiative to pressure banks to stop providing business services to industries such as payment processors, firearms sellers, payday lenders etc. As members of the FDIC's Advisory Committee on Economic Inclusion, CRL board member Wade Henderson pushed agency leadership to crack down on the payday lending industry—one of the industries targeted by Operation Choke Point. Additionally, according to emails uncovered by the Oversight investigation, Mark Pearce (former CRL president and current director of FDIC's Division of Depositor and Consumer Protection), was exploring ways for FDIC to "get at payday lending". The report found Pearce used his position to push for stringent regulations on the payday lending industry.  CRL praised efforts by Operation Choke Point to increase regulations on payday lenders.

References

External links
Self Help
Center for Responsible Lending
Political organizations based in the United States
Financial services in the United States
Think tanks established in 2002
2002 establishments in North Carolina
501(c)(3) organizations
Non-profit organizations based in North Carolina